Terry Moore (born May 25, 1952) is an American politician serving as a member of the Montana House of Representatives from the 54th district. Elected in November 2018, he assumed office on January 7, 2019.

Early life and education 
Born and raised in Billings, Montana, Moore earned a Bachelor of Science degree in business with a concentration in accounting from Montana State University.

Career 
Moore worked as the chief financial officer of First Interstate Bank. He was also a manager at KPMG. Moore was elected to the Montana House of Representatives in November 2018 and assumed office on January 7, 2019, succeeding Jeff Essmann.

References 

Living people
1952 births
Politicians from Billings, Montana
Montana State University alumni
Republican Party members of the Montana House of Representatives